Wilson Martin (February 12, 1899 – June 20, 1978), sometimes listed as "William", and nicknamed "Stack", was an American Negro league first baseman in the 1920s.

A native of Cairo, Illinois, Martin made his Negro leagues debut in 1925 with the Indianapolis ABCs. He played for the ABCs again the following season, then spent two seasons with the Detroit Stars. Martin died in San Francisco, California in 1978 at age 79.

References

External links
 and Seamheads

1899 births
1978 deaths
Detroit Stars players
Indianapolis ABCs players
Baseball first basemen
Baseball players from Illinois
People from Cairo, Illinois
20th-century African-American sportspeople